The , also known as the Cottonian Vocabulary or the Old Cornish Vocabulary, is a Latin-Old Cornish glossary. It is usually interpreted as an Old Cornish translation of Ælfric of Eynsham's Latin-Old English Glossary, and it is considered to be the most substantial extant document of the Old Cornish period. The only surviving copy, part of a composite manuscript known as MS Cotton Vespasian A. XIV, is now kept in the British Library, and is thought to have been copied around 1200 AD from an earlier exemplar.

History
During the migration period, Germanic tribes began to settle in Britain during the 5th century after Roman occupation came to an end. The Common Brittonic language, which had been spoken over most of Roman Britain, was pushed west, eventually separating into Western Brittonic (the ancestor of Welsh) and Southwestern Brittonic (the ancestor of Cornish and Breton) under the westward advance of Anglo-Saxon forces.

Dating and provenance 
This date was based on an evaluation by Max Förster, now thought to be incorrect, that the Old English of Ælfric's glossary would not have been understood much beyond this date, and is now generally thought to be too early. Most modern assessments estimate a document date of around 1200 or slightly later, from an original that was probably made around 1150 or sometime in the second half of the 12th century, presumably in Cornwall or by a Cornish speaker. It is now a part of the Cotton collection in the British Library.

Content
The  is part of a composite manuscript known as MS Cotton Vespasian A XIV containing texts believed to have been made between the early 11th and late 12th century. Other than the Latin-Old Cornish glossary, the manuscript only contains Welsh material, including a Calendar of Welsh saints and an account of the founding of Brycheiniog by the legendary Brychan.

Physical format 
Only a single copy of the document survives, written in ink on sheets of parchment, and consisting of seven sides, written on folios 7r to 10r of the manuscript. Each folio is approximately 5  x 8  inches (210 x 145 mm).

Structure 
The glossary itself follows the structure of Ælfric's Glossary, in general agreement with the original entry order, with the Anglo-Saxon glosses substituted by Old Cornish ones. As with Ælfric's Glossary, the lemmata are grouped thematically, usually with a Latin lemma followed by a Cornish translation equivalent, beginning with entries for God, heaven, angel, then elements of the Genesis creation narrative including star, sun, moon, the Earth and sea, and human beings. The vocabulary continues with a range of subjects including parts of the body, ranks in the church hierarchy, family members, secular positions and class divisions, words for various kinds of professions and artisans and their associated tools, personality traits, illnesses and afflictions, legal terminology, the weather, times of the day, seasons of the year, colours, birds, fish, insects, domestic and wild mammals, herbs, trees, topographical features, architectural terms, household items, clothing, and food and drink, finishing with some adjectives and ending with the Cornish word for 'saddle'. The vocabulary contains a total of 961 lemmata, compared with 1,269 in Ælfric's Glossary.

Numbering 
Lemmata in the Vocabularium Cornicum are conventionally labelled by the numerical identifier they are assigned by Eugene Van Tassel Graves in the PhD dissertation The Old Cornish Vocabulary. So for instance, "VC 1" refers to the first entry in the text, " . " 'almighty God'.

Vocabulary
These include VC 32  'heaven, sky' (from Proto-Celtic ), VC 35  'land' (from ), VC 40  'head' (from ), VC 128  'vessel' (from ), and VC 58  'nail' (from ).

During the Roman occupation of Britain, the Common Brittonic language acquired a large number of Latin loanwords, which were assimilated into the language and in general underwent the same phonological changes as inherited Celtic words. The  attests many of these loanwords, and 19% of the translation equivalents are probably derived from British Latin. The many examples include VC 73  'arm' (from British Latin ), VC 235  'net' (from ), and VC 848  'cheese' (from ). There are also a smaller number of loans from late Old English (5%) and Old French (2%), and approximately 1% are of unknown origin. Old English loans include VC 711  'way' (from Old English ), VC 796  'boot' (from ) and VC 229  'art' (from ). The Old French loans, probably borrowed through English, include VC 167  'emperor' (from Old French ), VC 232  'craftsman' (from ), and VC 419  'foolish' (from ).

However, there are a number of undisputed Welsh glosses, sometimes side by side with their Cornish equivalent, linked by the Latin abbreviation ⟨ł⟩ ( 'or'), and for a few lemmata only a Welsh gloss is given. Jon Mills points out that, where there are double glosses, sometimes the Cornish word is given first (e.g. VC 848 " ł " 'cheese'), and in other cases the Welsh is given first (e.g. VC 75 " ł " 'hand'). Occasionally, the scribe translates the Old English gloss from Ælfric's original Glossary, rather than the Latin lemma, sometimes resulting in the Latin being incorrectly translated (for example, VC 561  translates Old English  'mixture of dog and wolf' rather than the Latin lemma ), and several lemmata are not translated at all. As Old Welsh, Old Breton, and Old Cornish were very similar at this time, many of the glosses would have been indistinguishable in all three languages, and Alderik Blom estimates that around 35% of the entries would have been spelled almost identically in Cornish and in Welsh, without even taking into account the considerable number of words that would have exhibited only minor vocalic differences. Nonetheless, some of the entries are certainly Welsh or show Welsh features. Oliver Padel provisionally estimates that, of all the entries, 503 are certainly Cornish, 305 could be Cornish or Welsh, 38 are Welsh or show some Welsh feature, and 94 are either unknown or "not Brittonic".

Jackson suggests that the copyist was a Welshman, who occasionally substituted or added Welsh words when copying the Cornish words in his exemplar, originally made either in Cornwall or by a Cornish speaker.

Orthography 
Like Old Welsh and Old Breton, Old Cornish orthography was originally based on the pronunciation of British Latin. In final position, ⟨p⟩, ⟨t⟩, ⟨c⟩, ⟨b⟩, ⟨d⟩, and ⟨g⟩ are generally used for the phonemes /b/, /d/, /ɡ/, /β/, /ð/, and /ɣ/ respectively, meaning that the results of Brittonic lenition are not usually apparent from the orthography when these phonemes occur in word-final position. However, in internal position, lenition is regularly shown.

Phonology 
The orthography used in  demonstrates the development of several characteristic Cornish sound changes, and the document is important for reconstructing the phonological history of Cornish. Assibilation of the clusters /lt/ to /ls/ (e.g. , Welsh ) and /nt/ to /ns/ (e.g. , Welsh ), and, in one case, assibilation of /d/ to /z/, is shown. Denasalization of the lenited reflex of early Common Brittonic /m/ to /v/ is regularly written as ⟨f⟩, ⟨u⟩, and ⟨v⟩. Svarabhakti is regularly written as ⟨e⟩, and is found 40 times in the manuscript according to Jackson, against 3 entries where it is expected but is not written. The merger of the /uɪ/ and /ɔɪ/ diphthongs is shown in writing by an indiscriminate mixture of ⟨ui⟩ and ⟨oi⟩ spellings.

Notes

References 

Celtic languages
Brittonic languages
Cornish language
Cornish literature